Shantou University (abbreviated STU), a key comprehensive university under the provincial Project 211 program in Shantou, Guangdong, was founded in 1981 with the approval of the State Council. 

It is the only public university that receives funding from the Li Ka Shing Foundation. 

It is also supported by the Ministry of Education (MOE), the Guangdong Provincial Government and the Li Ka Shing Foundation.

History
Shantou University (STU) was founded in 1981 and started student enrollment in 1983.  It is the only institution of higher education in the Chaoshan area.

STU, a key comprehensive university under the provincial Project 211 program, was founded in 1981 with the approval of the State Council. As the only public university that receives long-term funding from the Li Ka Shing Foundation, it is jointly supported by the Ministry of Education, the Guangdong Provincial Government and the Li Ka Shing Foundation. The Li Ka Shing Foundation has committed and donated a total of HK$5.4 billion to support Shantou University (including the Cheung Kong Graduate School of Business), of which HK$4.2 billion has already been donated as of 2012.

STU is planning to relocate the Medical College into the main campus and to develop a globally advanced curriculum focusing on life science. Since 2001, the University has conducted a profound internationalization-oriented reform, and overseas talents have been recruited to serve as provost, vice president and deans. Through a series of reforms in curriculum design, teaching, resources management and human resources system, it aims to offer a platform for the exploration of higher educational reform in China.

STU is strongly supported by the Central, Provincial, and Municipal authorities. The Current General secretary visited the university in the early 1990s. Former General secretary Jiang Zemin paid two visits to the university and wrote the following inscription as praise and encouragement to the staff and students: “The mission is demanding and the journey ahead is long.” Other leaders of the Central Government have also visited the university. Among them are Chinese President and General Secretary of the Communist Party  Hu Jintao, Premier Li Peng, NPC(National People's Congress), Chairman Qiao Shi, CPPCC Chairman Li Ruihuan, Vice Premier Li Lanqing and Vice Governor of Guangdong Wang Yang.

In 2012, the Ministry of Education, the Guangdong Provincial Government and the Li Ka Shing Foundation signed a tripartite agreement to co-develop STU. The agreement was reached to support STU’s continuing reform efforts geared to an internationally renowned and nationally elite university.

Institution
Organization Structure of Shantou University (As of May 2014)

Current Student Enrollment

History

Background of Establishment
 

With the support and assistance of the Li Ka Shing Foundation and government officials at all levels, STU has achieved rapid development in the past three decades. Relations between the Li Ka Shing Foundation and University Communist party officials have soured over the years with significant conflict occurring in 2018 and 2019. As of 2019 the Li Ka Shing Foundation no longer has an office on campus.

On August 26, 1983, the State Council granted permission to establish STU.
In 1983, STU began to enroll undergraduate students, and the Ministry of Education approved Shantou Medical Vocational School to be merged into STU and renamed Shantou University Medical College (SUMC).
On January 1, 1984, the STU foundation stone-laying ceremony was held.
On June 20, 1986, Deng Xiaoping received Mr. Li Ka-shing in Beijing and suggested that STU should develop along freer lines and gradually attain the status of a national key university.
On February 10, 1987, the STU Council was established.
On February 8, 1990, the STU inauguration ceremony was held.
In 1991, STU was listed among the universities to enroll students with scores above the first-round undergraduate admission cut-off mark.
In 1993, STU was authorized to conduct Master’s programs.
In 1998, STU was authorized to offer doctoral programs.
In 2001, STU started its comprehensive educational reform.
In 2001, the “Sunshine Finance” reform was launched.
In 2001, the Preclinical Medicine Center for post-doctoral studies was established.
In 2002, Pathology and Pathophysiology were approved by the MOE as a National Key Discipline.
In 2002, the Credit System Reform and English Enhancement Program were launched.
In 2002, the system-based integrated medical curriculum was implemented.
In 2006, the EIP-CDIO engineering educational reform was initiated.
In 2007, the reform of the faculty’s annual-salary system was conducted.
In 2008, STU was approved by the Ministry of Education to admit students who are recommended for master's degree programs without taking the exam.
In 2008, the pilot project of residential college system reform was launched, and the full-range undergraduate residential college, Veritas College, was established.
In 2009, STU was Designated by the GD Government as a pilot university for transforming into a self-governing institution of higher education. 
In 2011, STU’s proposed program of transform itself into a self-governing institution of higher education and conducting Medical Educational Reform was designated as the “Guangdong Pilot Project of Comprehensive Educational Reform”.
In 2011, Integrative Thinking core curriculum was designed for freshmen enrolled in 2011.
In 2012, each undergraduate student was required to take a community service course.
In 2012, the Business School’s Business Administration Degree Program was the first in Asia to pass the international accreditation of EPAS – EFMD (European Foundation for Management Development) Programme Accreditation System.
In June 2012, the Ministry of Education, the Guangdong Provincial Government and the Li Ka Shing Foundation signed a tripartite agreement to co-develop STU.
In 2013, STU was listed by the Ministry of Education of China as a mainland China partner university in “The Faculty and Students Exchange Programme between Universities in Hong Kong and Mainland China”.

Leadership
 Honorary Chairman of Shantou University Council: Li Ka-Shing
 Chairmen of Shantou University Council: Wu Nansheng, Lu Zhonghe, Li Hongzhong, Song Hai, and Chen Yunxian (current Chairman)
 
 Honorary President: Xu Dixin
 
 Presidents: Xu Dixin, Yang Yingqun, Dai Jingchen, Lin Weiming, Zhang Xiangwei, and Xu Xiaohu (current President)
 
 Party Secretaries: Lin Chuan, Yang Yingqun, Lin Weiming, Huang Zanfa, Xie Liangao, and Song Yaozhen (current Party Secretary)

Campus
Shantou University covers an area of 1.26 km2 with a total floor space of 455,500m2.

New Library

 
The STU new library, constructed with an investment from the Li Ka Shing Foundation of about 200 million RMB, was inaugurated and put into service in 2009. It is reputed as “the most beautiful university library in Asia”. The new library was designed by Ray Chen. Situated at the core of the library is the Grate Hall of Reading.

With a total area of 21,000 square meters, the library features 1500 seats and 27 seminar rooms, and also has an exhibition room, lecture hall, conference center and Student Lounge. The library is covered with a wireless LAN to facilitate online journals database access. It took the lead in China in applying the UHF RFID technology to its book circulation as well as book sorting and checking. Total collections exceed 1,743,000 volumes or items, and the Chaoshan Literature Collection is listed in the project CADAL-China Academic Digital Associative Library, a national digital library project co-sponsored by the Ministry of Education, Ministry of Finance and National Development and Reform Commission.

The statue entitled “Looking up • Looking down”, one of the masterpieces of the British sculptor Zadok Ben-David, is placed near the entrance to the library.

Ju Ming’s Sculpture Series “Living World”
In June 2006, the bronze sculpture series, “Living World” from Ju Ming, a famous Taiwanese sculptor, was positioned besides the picturesque reservoir on STU campus.  The lower part of the cylinder-shaped building that holds the sculpture is constructed as a half-open reservoir working room.

The Great Hall
The Great Hall, also known as the auditorium, has a total area of over 5,600m2 and a seating capacity of 1,798. It is equipped with 
advanced lighting, audiovisuals, and air conditioning.

Block A

Block A, STU’s new administrative building, was inaugurated by Mr. Li Ka-Shing on June 28, 2012. The building covers a total area of 5,545m2 and has a floor space of 16,319 m2.

Academic Conference Center (ACC)
The academic conference center was designed by William Chang Suk Ping. The ACC has over 50 rooms and conference halls.

STU Sports Park
On June 29, 2012, a special ceremony was held to launch the STU sports arena project at its construction site. The Sports Park is designed to cover an area of 60,868.6m2 and has a total construction area of 52,127.4m2. It includes a 6,000-seat multi-use arena, a natatorium with pool, sport and fitness training facilities, a conference hall, a 200-room hotel and a car park for 200 vehicles. The sports arena is known as“High Park”. Li Ka Shing Foundation will offer full funding for the Construction Project, which is estimated as 350 million RMB. The construction project was scheduled to be completed in 2015. The sports arena will serve as a platform in support of STU’s whole-person education.

Colleges and Schools

Shantou University consists of the following colleges and schools:

 College of Liberal Arts
 College of Science
 College of Engineering
 Medical College
 Law School
 Business School (Cheung Kong Graduate School of Business)
 Cheung Kong School of Journalism and Communications
 Cheung Kong School of Art and Design
 School of Continuing Education
 Veritas College (residential college)
 English Language Center

College of Liberal Arts
Dean: Mao Sihui

College of Science

Dean: Liu Wenhua

College of Engineering
Dean: Chen Yan

As the first CDIO (Conceive, Design, Implement, and Operate) member in China, the College has adopted the new EIP-CDIO (EIP stands for Ethics, Integrity, and Professionalism) educational model in line with the international practices related to engineering education.

Law School

Dean: Huai Xiaofeng

Based on the international approach of education called PLEASE (Professor, Language, Edited textbook, Activities, Disciplines and Employment), the School adopts bilingual and English immersed teaching modes for various programs including Alternative Dispute Resolution (ADR), which received the accreditation of the Hong Kong International Administration Centre.  The curriculum for the program of Public Administration is designed to help develop professionals for international public administration projects.

Business School
Dean: Lu Yuan

In response to the requirements set by the accreditation authorities at home and abroad, the School is engaged in developing a distinctive teaching model that incorporates theories, arts, and techniques.  Composed of interrelated disciplines, the curriculum focuses on advanced economic and management theories and practices, as well as the analysis of successful cases of domestic enterprises.  To help develop new business professionals with morality, aspiration and power, the School has also set up the Chinese (esp. Chao-Shan) Business Case Bank, the Practice Base and Innovation Base for students, which helps to appropriately combine teaching theory, vocational training and student practicing.

Medical College

Dean: Bian Junhui

With the implementation of the new paradigm of “system-based integrated teaching,” the College offers English-immersed courses to educate students in clinical medicine, medical ethics, scientific research and innovation, so as to develop practical medical abilities with high overall competence and innovation.

Cheung Kong School of Journalism and Communication

Dean: Fan Dongsheng

With the reference to Columbia University’s and University of Missouri’s programs, the School develops a “fundamental but practical” curriculum, with international and practice-oriented features.  It adopts the worldwide used curriculum system of “Platform Module” and offers small-group classes, English-immersed, and bilingual courses.  It is also developing a four-year discipline in Journalistic English. The Pulitzer Prize-winning journalist Peter Arnett has taught at the school since 2007.

Cheung Kong School of Art and Design

Dean: Wang Shouzhi

School of Continuing Education
Dean: Wang Kanghua

Veritas College
Dean: Li Dan

In July 2008, Shantou University established Veritas College, a residential college.

English Language Center

Director: Mao Sihui

The English Language Center (ELC) was founded in 2003. The ELC provides English training for all students at Shantou University's main campus. The core of its program consists of a two-year series of required courses. The ELC also offers elective courses which are aimed at more specialized skills (debate, speech, academic writing, etc.). The ELC organizes many co-curricular activities.

Affiliated Hospitals

English Enhancement Program
In May 2002, the English Language Center (ELC) was set up and the “English Enhancement Program” was initiated to reform English language teaching designed for university-wide students who would like to pass CET.

EIP-CDIO Approach of Engineering Education
In 2005, upon thorough investigations on CDIO (Conceive, Design, Implement and Operate) approach and local needs in China, and referring to the successful experience of engineering educational reform in Canada, STU decided to adopt the CDIO Initiative. To adapt to the local needs, the University determined to use a design directed EIP-CDIP approach. EIP stands for Ethics, Integrity and Professionalism. In 2006, STU became the first CDIO member among Chinese universities. In 2010, STU was selected by the Ministry of Education to be among the first group of universities to conduct the “Outstanding Engineer Education Program”.

International Accreditation for Undergraduate Programs
STU continued to promote its work concerning international accreditation for its undergraduate programs. In 2011, the Business School’s BBA (Bachelor of Business Administration) program was granted EFMD Programme Accreditation System (EPAS) accreditation, the first university in Asia to pass this kind of accreditation.

Whole-person Education
In 2008, STU established the first full-range residential college for undergraduate students in mainland China, Veritas College, where students from different majors live together.

Program Development and Research
Shantou University has 1 National Key Discipline, offers Cheung Kong Scholar Professorships, provides 3 Postdoctoral Programs, 1 Doctoral Program for first-level discipline and 25 Doctoral Programs for second-level disciplines, 10 Master’s Programs for first-level disciplines and 84 Master’s Programs for second-level disciplines, as well as 6 Professional master's degree Programs. It also has 1 National Key Laboratory and 5 Provincial Key Laboratories, 2 National Pilot Sites for Innovative Talents Training, 7 National Distinctive Programs, as well as 4 Provincial Branded Programs. The University now offers a comprehensive education system from bachelor to doctorate programs, including a 7-year master program in Clinical Medicine. Currently, STU has a staff of 5,113 and over 9,450 students and has nurtured nearly 70,000 graduates. The University consists of ten colleges and schools, namely, College of Liberal Arts, College of Sciences, College of Engineering, Medical College, Law School, Business School, Cheung Kong School of Art and Design, Cheung Kong School of Journalism and Communication, Graduate School, School of Continuing Education and Veritas College. It enrolls qualified students from all over the country (including Special Administrative Regions of Hong Kong and Macau, as well as Taiwan).  STU has established centers and laboratories, which conduct basic scientific research and directly serve local economic development, including the Artificial Intelligence Manufacturing Technology Laboratory funded by the Ministry of Education, STU Division of National Key Discipline in Molecular Pathology, Research Institute of Tumor Pathology, Marine Biology Laboratory of Guangdong Province, Image-processing Technology Key Laboratory of Guangdong Province, CAD/CAM Center, Laboratory for Wind Tunnel Testing, Laboratory for Structural Engineering, FMS Laboratory and Institute for Artificial Intelligence and Pattern Recognition.

In 2011, STU obtained 70,308,100 RMB in total funding for research projects, an increase of 45.8% over the previous year. Altogether, 54 projects were awarded a cumulative total of 27,547,000 RMB from the National Natural Science Foundation of China (NSFC) and the National Social Sciences Foundation. The national-level funding received was up by over 60%.

According to the statistics released by The Institute of Scientific and Technical Information of China (ISTIC) in December 2012, the average impact factor of SCIE-indexed periodicals where STU faculty and staff published their papers was raised from 1.92 in 2007 to 2.59 in 2011, which is historically high. STU ranked top for its paper citation counts in the “2012 Chinese Universities Nature & Science Publications Ranking”. In 2012, STU won the funding for major projects of cultural industry in Guangdong Province for the first time, and STU faculty were awarded the Funding for MOE New Century Outstanding Talents in humanities and social sciences for the first time.

International Exchange and Cooperation

STU takes full advantage of the support from the Li Ka Shing Foundation and the ties with overseas universities to strengthen academic exchange and cooperation.

Under the auspice of the Li Ka Shing Foundation, STU has become one of the few universities in Mainland China that awards full scholarships to overseas exchange students.  The university has established close academic ties with nearly 20 universities in such countries as the United States, United Kingdom, France, Japan, Russia, Australia and Germany, and launched exchange programs for undergraduates and graduate students.

Notable people
Du Gangjian, former Dean of the law school

References

 STU Facuts 2007 published by STU Publishing House
 STU Annual Report 2007 published by STU Publishing House

Universities and colleges in Guangdong
Shantou
Educational institutions established in 1981
Universities in China with English-medium medical schools